"Then I Met You" is a song by Australian recording artist Jessica Mauboy, announced as a single on 8 September 2017 in a Sony Music Australia media statement. "Then I Met You" was released digitally on 17 September 2017 as the second single from Mauboy's second soundtrack album, The Secret Daughter Season Two: Songs from the Original 7 Series.

Reception
In a review of the album, David from auspOp said ""Then I Met You" is Jess at her mid-tempo belter best. It’s a fairly straightforward song, but she gets the opportunity to showcase her great upper range." Thomas Bleach said "The RNB meets pop track goes back to her playful roots with a euphoric production and infectious hook" describing it as an "instantly catchy track".

Video
The music video for "Then I Met You" was directed by Emma Tomelty and released on 20 October 2017.  auspOp reviewed the video saying it's "Jess the pop star. In cool outfits. In cool locations. With an okay pop song."

Track listing
Digital download
"Then I Met You" – 3:13

Charts

Release history

References

2017 songs
2017 singles
Jessica Mauboy songs
Sony Music Australia singles
Songs written by Louis Schoorl
Songs written by Ivy Adara